Anthony Louis Banks, Baron Stratford (8 April 1942 – 8 January 2006) was a British politician who served as Minister for Sport from 1997 to 1999. A member of the Labour Party, he was a member of Parliament from 1983 to 2005 and subsequently as a member of the House of Lords. He was well known in the House of Commons for his acid tongue.

Career before politics

Banks was born at the Jubilee Maternity Hospital, Belfast, the only son and elder child of Albert Herbert Banks, a sergeant in the Royal Army Service Corps who before the Second World War had been a toolmaker, and his wife, Olive Irene (Rene), née Rusca. The family returned to England after the birth, and he grew up in Brixton and Tooting. He was educated at St John's School, Brixton, and Tenison's School, Kennington. He failed his "O" Levels and left school to work as a clerk for a few years, but studied at night school to gain the qualifications necessary for university. From 1964 to 1967 he studied politics at the University of York, where he was President of the Student Representative Council. He graduated with an upper-second degree in 1967, then undertook further study at the London School of Economics.

Banks then became a trade union official, first for the Amalgamated Union of Engineering Workers, from 1969 to 1975, then as Assistant General Secretary of the Association of Broadcasting Staff, from 1976 to 1983 (it later merged with other unions to form the Broadcasting, Entertainment, Cinematograph and Theatre Union or BECTU). For several years Banks was responsible for freelancers.

Political career
In 1964 Banks unsuccessfully stood for the Liberal Party in the first elections for the London Borough Councils that began operation in 1965. He later joined the Labour Party. He was a member of Lambeth Council from 1971 to 1974, and during the 1970s and 1980s he was a prominent member of the Greater London Council (GLC), representing Hammersmith (1970–1977) and Tooting (1981–1986). He was Chairman of the GLC from 1985 until its abolition in 1986.

Having unsuccessfully contested East Grinstead in 1970, Newcastle upon Tyne North in October 1974 (by 469 votes), and Watford in 1979, Banks won Newham North West for Labour in 1983, defeating his predecessor, Arthur Lewis, who had been deselected as Labour's candidate. Following a boundary review in 1995, Newham North West was expanded and renamed West Ham for the general election in 1997. Banks retained the seat until 2005, when he stood down.

Ministerial post
After Labour's election victory in 1997 Banks was appointed Minister for Sport in the Department for Culture, Media and Sport. He called for foreign players in the English Premiership to become eligible to play for England: "Can you imagine seeing Cantona and Giggs swapping the Red of Manchester for the White of England?" He also suggested that the football teams of the four constituent parts of the UK should merge to compete in the Olympic Games, as eventually occurred in 2012. However his calling for one UK football team in 1997 was met with ridicule from supporters and one colleague, the Scottish Labour MP Sam Galbraith, stated that the creation of such a team would only happen "over his dead body". Banks also offended Scotland's supporters by describing the team as the "West Ham of world football - they never quite perform to their potential"

Among Banks's ministerial responsibilities were listed buildings, and he approved controversial additions including the 1930s Three Magpies pub in Birmingham and numerous redundant NHS buildings. He was also responsible for Grade I listing the Severn Bridge.

After two years in office he stepped down to become the Prime Minister's envoy for England's bid to host the 2006 FIFA World Cup. The bid failed and Germany won instead. From then until his retirement from the Commons in 2005 Banks remained a backbencher, though he made a failed bid to become Labour's candidate in the election for Mayor of London in 2004.

Political views
Banks was a vegetarian, a supporter of animal rights and a Vice-President of the League Against Cruel Sports. He was regarded as on the left of Labour, being a republican, an opponent of the 2003 invasion of Iraq and a member of the Socialist Campaign Group. His only speeches regarding the 2001 invasion of Afghanistan involved requests for government money and the help of the Royal Navy for the animals of the Kabul Zoo, particularly for Marjan, an elderly lion that needed air-conditioning for its rheumatism.

On 21 May 2004 Banks proposed an Early Day Motion in response to newspaper reports that MI5 had proposed using pigeons as flying bombs during the Second World War. The motion condemned the proposal, described human beings as "obscene, perverted, cruel, uncivilised and lethal", and proposed that the House "looks forward to the day when the inevitable asteroid slams into the Earth and wipes them out, thus giving nature the opportunity to start again".

Banks was also a supporter of the arts and chaired the House of Commons Works of Art Committee, which had responsibility for historic paintings and sculptures in the Palace of Westminster.

Outspoken behaviour

In 1990, responding to a speech by the Conservative MP Terry Dicks opposing government funding for the arts, Banks said that Dicks was "living proof that a pig's bladder on a stick can get elected to Parliament". Banks also described another Conservative MP, Nicholas Soames, as "a one-man food mountain". Banks referred to Canadians as "dickheads" for culling seals.

During a question on Basildon's maternity services in 1994, Banks remarked that then Conservative MP for the area, David Amess had (as the father of five children) "put far too much pressure on Basildon's maternity services and suggested he use "a do-it-yourself vasectomy kit with two bricks."

At the Labour Party conference in 1997 Banks described William Hague, then Leader of the Conservative Party, as a "foetus", adding that Conservative MPs might be rethinking their views on abortion.

Banks crossed his fingers when he took the oath of allegiance to the Queen during a new session of Parliament. Banks said that he was wishing himself luck in his new job as Minister for Sport.

Retirement
On 23 November 2004, Banks announced that he would not stand at the next general election. Three days later, in an interview with Robin Oakley on BBC Radio 4, he said "To be honest, I found it intellectually numbing and tedious in the extreme. I most certainly won't miss the constituency work. I've got to tell you that honestly. It's 22 years of the same cases, but just the faces and the people changing. It might sound a little disparaging to say this about people's lives and their problems, and we did deal with them, ... but I got no satisfaction from this at all. I really didn't. And all you were was a sort of high-powered social worker and perhaps not even a good one at that. I will miss being Chairman of the Works of Art Committee . . . because I was having so much intellectual enjoyment, and indeed just straightforward fun, out of reorganising our collection, and that kept me in touch with history".

On 24 March 2005 he made his final speech in the House of Commons. A week after the general election, on 13 May 2005, it was announced that he would be created a life peer, and on 23 June 2005 the peerage was gazetted as Baron Stratford, of Stratford in the London Borough of Newham.

Personal life, death and legacy
Banks was married to Sally Jones. He was a keen supporter of Chelsea F.C. and regularly attended matches. He was a member of the British Humanist Association.

On 7 January 2006, Banks was reported to have collapsed two days earlier after suffering a massive stroke while having lunch on Sanibel Island in Florida, where he was on holiday. He was flown by helicopter to a hospital in Fort Myers and died on 8 January without regaining consciousness. The Prime Minister, Tony Blair, described him as "one of the most charismatic politicians in Britain, a true man of the people".

His funeral was held on 21 January at the City of London Crematorium. John Prescott, Tessa Jowell, Margaret Beckett, Alastair Campbell, Tony Benn, Chris Smith and Richard Caborn attended. Banks's friend, Conservative MP David Mellor, gave an address paying tribute. "A lord of misrule, a cheeky chappy, call him what you will—he can be defined but he cannot be replaced," said Mellor.

Following her husband's death, Lady Stratford vowed to continue his animal rights work, leading a campaign against the culling of seal pups in Canada. She is also a patron of the Captive Animals Protection Society, a charity campaigning for an end to the use of animals in circuses, zoos and the exotic pet trade.

In popular culture
The Wit and Wisdom of Tony Banks, edited by Iain Dale, was published in 1998.

His death on 8 January 2006 was referenced in the first series of The Ricky Gervais Show as part of Karl Pilkington's diary of his holiday to Gran Canaria. Pilkington spoke of Banks' death: "There was a piece on the news about how everyone was shocked".

An American singer-songwriter, Aimee Mann, became a close friend of Banks after meeting him in London in the early 1990s. The song "You're With Stupid Now" on her 1995 album I'm with Stupid was inspired by their discussions of British politics.

Arms

References

External links
Tony Banks's campaign to rescue the animals of the Kabul Zoo, BBC News Online, 23 November 2001
Request in Commons for Royal Navy transport for the Kabul Zoo animals to the UK, 14 January 2002
Tony Banks, the scourge of hunting, to quit Parliament, Daily Telegraph, 25 November 2004
Banks changes name for Lords life, BBC News Online

Obituary in The Guardian
Obituary in the Daily Telegraph
The Right Hon wag – The Guardian
BBC – Political portraits auctioned off

1942 births
2006 deaths
Alumni of the London School of Economics
Alumni of the University of York
British animal rights activists
British republicans
British socialists
British trade unionists
Labour Party (UK) MPs for English constituencies
Stratford
Members of the Greater London Council
People educated at Archbishop Tenison's Church of England School, Lambeth
People from Brixton
Transport and General Workers' Union-sponsored MPs
UK MPs 1983–1987
UK MPs 1987–1992
UK MPs 1992–1997
UK MPs 1997–2001
UK MPs 2001–2005
Life peers created by Elizabeth II